is a prison in Abashiri, Hokkaido Prefecture that opened in 1890. The northernmost prison in Japan, it is located near the Abashiri River and east of Mount Tento. It holds inmates with sentences of less than ten years. Older parts of the prison were relocated to the base of Mount Tento in 1983, where they operate as the country's only prison museum.

History
In part to increase Japanese populations on the island as part of the Meiji Restoration, the Meiji government implemented penal transportation policies for Hokkaido in 1868. In April 1890, the Meiji government sent over a thousand political prisoners to the isolated Abashiri village. Many of these political prisoners were samurai from Tokugawa period who were convicted during the 1877 Satsuma rebellion.

Prisoners were forced to perform a variety of tasks from carpentry to agriculture. Notably, poor water quality in neighboring areas forced convicts to build water pipes, dams, and reservoirs to supply their own drinking water and irrigate neighboring fields. In addition, covicts at Abashiri Prison were forced to build roads linking the area to the more populous south. Construction of Hokkaido's Central Road relied on penal labor from Hokkaido. Many prisoners died along one section of the road between Abashiri village and Asahikawa, causing it to be referred to as Prisoner's Road. Initial conditions were extremely harsh, with insufficient food and rest, and over 200 prisoners died as a result of malnutrition, accidents, and as punishment for attempting to escape.

The political advisor Kaneko Kentaro had previously submitted a report implying that the government was not responsible for providing funerary services to convicts who perished during the process of road building. During the 1960s, Hokkaido residents were influenced by a nationwide effort to uncover history and began excavating prisoner remains along Prisoner's Road.

Abashiri prison was constructed amid the globalization and standardization of penal theory. The built environment facilitated discipline and surveillance, which was emphasized by the panopticon layout of the building.

Abashiri Prison later became known for being a self-sufficient farming prison, and was cited as a model for others throughout Japan.

Most of the prison burned down in a 1909 fire, but it was reconstructed in 1912. In 1984, the prison moved to a modern reinforced concrete complex.

Due to the 1965 film Abashiri Prison and its sequels, the prison became a popular tourist attraction. The prison is also known for its wooden  dolls carved by its inmates.

Museum

It is the only prison museum in the country. As of 2016, eight of the buildings preserved at the museum are designated Important Cultural Property by the Agency for Cultural Affairs, while three are registered Tangible Cultural Property. Those who visit the prison partake in dark tourism, tourism centered around areas significant because of death and suffering that occurred in those areas.

Notable inmates
Tsuda Sanzō, the policeman who attempted to assassinate Nicholas II of Russia
Yoshie Shiratori, the only person to escape from Abashiri Prison
Kyuichi Tokuda, politician imprisoned at Abashiri from 1934 to 1940
Kenji Miyamoto, politician
Branko Vukelić, Yugoslav spy
Shūsuke Nomura, activist
George Abe, author and former yakuza
Kōzō Minō, former yakuza whose memoirs were turned into the Battles Without Honor and Humanity film series
Hajime Itō, author of the novel Abashiri Bangaichi, which was adapted into two films, the second of which spawned the Abashiri Prison film series

In fiction 
The 1965 film Abashiri Prison spawned a popular series of yakuza films featuring the prison.

In the 2012 video game Yakuza 5, one of the protagonists, Taiga Saejima, escapes from Abashiri Prison, making his way to a village deep in the mountains of Hokkaido.

In "Mako Tanida", a 2014 episode of the television series The Blacklist, the episode's titular yakuza boss escapes from Abashiri Prison.

The 2014 manga series Golden Kamuy, set shortly after the Russo-Japanese War, features a raid on Abashiri Prison as one of its major plot points.

In the 2020 novel The Lost Future of Pepperharrow by Natasha Pulley, set in 1888 Japan, Abashiri Prison is one of the main plot locations.

References

External links

 Abashiri Prison Museum official website

Buildings and structures in Hokkaido
Prisons in Japan
Important Cultural Properties of Japan
Museums in Hokkaido
Prison museums in Asia
Relocated buildings and structures
Abashiri, Hokkaido